David Hirshleifer is an American economist.  He is a professor of finance and currently holds the Merage chair in Business Growth at the University of California at Irvine. As of 2018 he became President-Elect of the American Finance Association. In 2017, he was elected as Vice President of the American Finance Association (AFA) and assigned as Research Associate to National Bureau of Economic Research. He was previously a professor at the University of Michigan, Ohio State University, and UCLA. His research is mostly related to behavioral finance and informational cascades.  In 2007, he was on the Top 100 list of most cited economist by Web of Science's Most-Cited Scientists in Economics & Business.

Background
David is the son of Jack Hirshleifer, a deceased UCLA economics professor. He is married to Siew Hong Teoh, Dean's Professor of accounting at the University of California at Irvine. He served in editorial position for the Journal of Finance from 2003 to 2011. In addition, he also served as editor from 2001 to 2007 and executive editor from 2011 to 2014 for the Review of Financial Studies.

Research
Hirshleifer's research areas include the modeling of social influence, theoretical and empirical asset pricing, and corporate finance. He is the originator of the theory of information cascades, and has modeled investor psychology and its effects on security market under- and over-reactions.  His scholarly work on cascades has also received attention from popular economics, with references in both mainstream business and economics media.  He is a contributor to the fields of behavioral economics and behavioral finance.

Much of his work on investor psychology has focused on the effects of biased self-attribution, overconfidence, and limited attention. He and his co-authors were awarded the 1999 Smith Breeden Award for research showing how investor overconfidence, in combination with biased self-attribution, can explain the short-run momentum (finance) and long-run reversal patterns found the returns of many stock markets. More recent work has shown how investor overconfidence may also help explain the forward premium puzzle in foreign exchange markets
.  In his work on limited attention, he has shown that both distracting events and lack of attention to relevant information can help explain important accounting anomalies such as post earnings announcement drift

Hirshleifer's research has taken several approaches to show that stock returns are not exclusively based on relevant financial information, but also incorporate factors such as investors' mood and superstitions.  His paper "Good Day Sunshine: Stock Returns and the Weather," found abnormally high returns in the New York Stock Exchange composite on days that it was abnormally sunny in the New York city area. His research on the Chinese initial public offering market has provided evidence that Chinese companies which contain listing code numbers considered lucky in Chinese culture are initially priced much higher than financially similar Chinese firms debuting with unlucky numbers in their listing codes.

In addition to investor psychology, Hirshleifer also examines behavior of different parties in financial market. His work with Usman Ali developed a method to identify insider tradings for a firm, which can be used to predict this firm's opportunistic behavior such as earnings management, restatements, SEC enforcement actions, shareholder litigation, and executive compensation. This paper is later reported by Justin Lahart on Wall Street Journal. His research, "Psychological Bias as a Driver of Financial Regulations", argued that regulator psychology plays an important role in financial markets.  This research has garnered attention as the 2007 financial crisis has led to greater a scrutiny about the process of setting financial regulation.

Books
Together with his father, Jack Hirshleifer, and the economist Amihai Glazer, Hirshleifer is the coauthor of the microeconomics textbook Price Theory and Applications: Decisions, Information, and Markets.

Selected publications

References

External links
  David Hirshleifer's website.

Economists from California
Financial economists
University of California, Irvine faculty
Living people
1958 births
Ross School of Business faculty
21st-century American economists
Presidents of the American Finance Association
The Review of Financial Studies editors